The following is a partial list of eponymous roads in London – that is, roads named after people – with notes on the link between the road and the person.  Examples of reigning monarchs, Prime Ministers etc. with no inherent geographic link are omitted or kept to one example as there are many streets named "Victoria + descriptor" and "Wellington + descriptor" for example.

Roads and streets

Squares

See also
 List of eponymous streets in Metro Manila
 List of eponymous streets in New York City

References

Further reading
The Streets of Richmond and Kew, Richmond Local History Society, 2019.

External links

Historic streets of London: an alphabetical handbook (1923) from the Internet Archive

Roads in London
 
Roads, eponymous
Lists of roads named after people